Veer Teja Ji or Tejaji is a Rajasthani folk deity. He is considered one of the major eleven incarnations of Shiva and worshipped as a deity in whole (Rural & Urban) Rajasthan.

Veer Teja was born around 1074 in Khadnal, Rajasthan, India. His parents, Ramkunwari and Tahar, were Jats.

Legend has it that Teja died in 1103. The story says that he died because of snake bite, he allowed a snake to bite his tongue, that being the only unwounded area of his body. In return, the snake promised that no person or animal would die from a snakebite if they sought the blessings of Teja.

People in Rajasthan particularly call upon this promise on Shukla tenth of the month of Bhadrapada, a day that is set aside for marking his death.

Anthropologists say the Tejaji following sect is protagonist that includes an element of protest against the caste system.

See also
Tejaji Temple at Kharnal - place where Tejaji was born
Tejaji temple at Paner - place where Tejaji was married
Shree Veer Tejaji samadhi sthala Temple, Sursura - place where Tejaji attained Nirvana

Commemoration
In September 2011, India Post released a commemorative stamp depicting Tejaji.

A Rajasthani language movie titled Veer Tejaji, based on the life of Tejaji was made in the 1980s.

References

Further reading
 Madan Meena: Tejaji Gatha (Hadoti & Hindi), Kota Heritage Society, Kota, 2012  (Published under the World Oral Literature Project, University of Cambridge, UK)

Folk deities of Rajasthan
Hindu folk deities
1304 deaths
1250s births
Regional Hindu gods